Untreated Trauma is the sixth studio album by American rapper Mozzy. It was released on September 17, 2021 via Mozzy Records/EMPIRE. It features guest appearances from Babyface Ray, Celly Ru, E Mozzy, EST Gee, Kalan.FrFr and YFN Lucci. The album peaked at number 19 on the US Billboard 200 chart.

Track listing

Charts

References
 

2021 albums
Mozzy albums